Henryk Szlajfer (born 7 November 1947, Wrocław) – Polish economist and political scientist of Jewish origin, professor at the University of Warsaw, in the years 1993–2008, director of the Department of Strategy and Policy Planning, then of the American Department and archive at the Ministry of Foreign Affairs, appointed by then Prime Minister Jerzy Buzek as an ambassador ad personam, former ambassador-head of the Polish Permanent Representation to the OSCE, IAEA and other international organizations in Vienna.

Biography 
In 1968 Szlajfer and Adam Michnik, at that time students of the University of Warsaw, were expelled from the university for their opposition activity. On March 8, 1968, a rally took place in their defence, which marked the beginning of mass student protests called the March events. He was sentenced to 2 years in prison. Editor-in-chief of the quarterly magazine "Sprawy Międzynarodowe" (since 1992) and its English version "The Polish Quarterly of International Affairs". Member of the editorial board of the "Studia Polityczne" magazine (ISP PAN). In the 1990s in the Editorial Council of the "Journal of Latin American Studies" (Cambridge University Press).

Selected publications 
Economic Nationalism and Globalization: Lessons from Latin America and Central Europe, Brill, Leiden 2012
Western Europe, Eastern Europe and World Development 13th-18th Centuries: Collection of Essays of Marian Małowist (co-editor Jean Batou), Brill, Leiden 2009
The Faltering Economy. The Problem of Accumulation under Monopoly Capitalism (współredaktor John B. Foster), Monthly Review Press, New York 1984
From the Polish Underground. Selections from "Krytyka", 1978-1993 (współredaktor Michael Bernhard), The Pennsylvania State University Press 1995
Europa Środkowo-Wschodnia i Ameryka Południowa 1918-1939: szkice o nacjonalizmie ekonomicznym (Redakcja), PWN, Warszawa 1992
Dezintegracja przestrzeni eurazjatyckiej a bezpieczeństwo Europy Środkowej i Wschodniej, PISM, Warszawa 1993
Polacy – Żydzi: zderzenie stereotypów:esej dla przyjaciół i innych, Wydawnictwo Naukowe SCHOLAR, Warszawa 2003
Droga na skróty: nacjonalizm gospodarczy w Ameryce Łacińskiej i Europie Środkowo-Wschodniej w epoce pierwszej globalizacji: kategorie, analiza, kontekst porównawczy, ISP PAN, Warszawa 2005
Modernizacja zależności: kapitalizm i rozwój w Ameryce Łacińskiej, Osollineum, Wrocław 1984
Nineteenth century Latin America: two models of capitalism: the case of Haiti and Paraguay

References 

Living people
1947 births
Permanent Representatives of Poland to the United Nations
Polish economists
20th-century Polish Jews
21st-century Polish Jews
Diplomats from Wrocław
University of Warsaw alumni
Academic staff of the University of Warsaw